Aftermath is the fourth studio album by Battery, released on March 11, 1998 by COP International. The album peaked at #14 on the CMJ RPM Charts.

Track listing

Personnel 
Adapted from the Aftermath liner notes.

Three Mile Pilot
 Maria Azevedo – lead vocals, instruments
 Shawn Brice – instruments
 Evan Sornstein – instruments
Additional musicians
 Boom chr Paige – remixing (11)

Production and additional personnel
 Battery – production, recording
 Erik Butler – photography
 Curium Design – design
 Da5id Din – mastering
 Curtis Gamill – assistant production

Release history

References

External links 
 Aftermath at Discogs (list of releases)

1998 albums
COP International albums
Battery (electro-industrial band) albums